Sir Maurice Henry Dorman  (7 August 1912 – 26 October 1993) was the representative of the Crown in the then-Commonwealth Realms of Tanganyika, Trinidad and Tobago, Sierra Leone, and Malta. 

Dorman was born in 1912 and was the eldest son of John Ehrenfried Dorman and Madeleine Louise Bostock. Both his parents came from big industrial families in the town of Stafford. His mother was a magistrate and one of the first female dentists.

Dorman was educated at Sedbergh School and Magdalene College, Cambridge. He served in Sierra Leone from 1956 until 1962, for which he was knighted in 1957. From 27 April 1961 (Sierra Leone's independence day) to 27 April 1962, Dorman was the Governor-General of Sierra Leone. From 1962 until 1964, he was the Colonial Governor of Malta and then became Governor-General of Malta from September 1964 until July 1971, when he was replaced by Sir Anthony Mamo. In 1971–1972, he was a deputy chairman of the Pearce Commission.

He was a Deputy Lieutenant for Wiltshire and a Knight Grand Cross of the Maltese Order of Merit. He served as a member of the board of governors of Monkton Combe School from 1969 to 1992.

References

External links
 Listing of British representatives in Sierra Leone

|-

|-

1912 births
1993 deaths
British diplomats
Governors-General of Sierra Leone
Tanzanian politicians
Knights Grand Cross of the Order of St Michael and St George
Knights Grand Cross of the Royal Victorian Order
Bailiffs Grand Cross of the Order of St John
Deputy Lieutenants of Wiltshire
People educated at Sedbergh School
Alumni of Magdalene College, Cambridge
Governors-General of Malta
Governors of Trinidad and Tobago
Governors and Governors-General of Malta
Governors of Monkton Combe School